Ge Zhenfeng (born October 1944) is a retired general of China's People's Liberation Army.

Biography 
Born in Qingyuan County (now Qingyuan District, Baoding), Hebei, Ge joined the PLA in June 1962 and the Chinese Communist Party in July 1965. In 1984, he became the vice chief of staff of PLA army corps. In 1988, he was promoted to chief of staff of 39th army corps. He became the commander of 64th army corps in 1992. In November 1996, he was elevated to chief of staff of PLA Shenyang Military Region. He became vice commander of Shenyang MR in January 1999. In December 2000, he was appointed as vice president of PLA National Defense University. In July 2001, he became the president of PLA Academy of Military Science. From November 2002 to December 2009, he has served as executive vice chief of staff in General Staff Department of PLA. 

He was made lieutenant general in 1998, and awarded the rank of general on 20 June 2004.

References

Living people
1944 births
People's Liberation Army generals from Hebei
Politicians from Baoding
Chinese Communist Party politicians from Hebei
People's Republic of China politicians from Hebei